Anyplace Control is a Windows-based remote PC control product for remote access and control of remote PC located either in local network or in the Internet. It displays the remote computer's desktop on the screen of local PC, and allows control of that computer using the local mouse and keyboard. The software has a file transfer feature to send files between computers.

Remote users create an Access Password, username and password to access the target PC. The program must be installed at both computers, with client part of the software at the local PC.

Features
 Display of a remote computer's desktop in a real-time mode on local screen.
 Remote PC control.
 File transfer between remote computers.
 Turn on, turn off or reboot the remote PC.
 Disabling of remote mouse, keyboard, monitor.
 Connection through routers, firewalls and dynamic IP addresses

Security
1. Secure authentication and traffic encryption 
All transferred data is encrypted with the RC4 algorithm with 128 bit random key for encryption. 
2. Double password protection  
For connection to the remote computer via Internet the knowledge of at least two passwords is required: Account Password and remote PC Access Password. 
3. No open ports in the Firewall 
No need  to open additional ports in the firewall when connecting using Account Connection service.

Licensing
The product is shareware available for private and corporate usage. Licenses are provided on a per Host or Admin module basis.

References

External links
 Official Site
 PCIN Review
PC Advisor Review
Remote Desktop Software

Remote desktop